The 2009–10 Spanish football season is FC Cartagena's first season ever in Liga Adelante.

Trophies Balance

Summer Transfers

In

Out

Loan in

Loan end

Winter Transfers

In

Out

Loan in

Loan end

Current squad

Match results 

 All times are in CET/CEST

Pre-season

Friendly matches

Carabela de Plata Trophy

Trofeo Costa Cálida
This edition was celebrated in San Javier.

Liga Adelante

Copa del Rey

Second Round

Third Round

Others

El Derbi de la Región de Murcia 

This is the name which receives the match played between Real Murcia and FC Cartagena, because it is a match between two teams of the same autonomous community (Región de Murcia) that is played by the first time in the history with these team's names, because some derbis were played in Segunda División B when FC Cartagena was Cartagonova CF (the last one was in the 1999–2000 season).

In the first match of this season, FC Cartagena beat for 1–4, the biggest win away for the club cartagenero.

In second match, FC Cartagena confirms its aspirations of promotion to Liga BBVA qualifying second and Real Murcia remains debilitated in the middle-low positions of the table.

References 

1: Costa Cálida is a triangular trophy.

2: Neutral venue.

3: The team that wins this variable ranked ahead of another with the same points but lost on goal average. If the goal average is drawn between two or more teams and, at the end of the season these teams have the same points, the overall Liga Adelante's goal average prevails over this goal average.

4: As Murcia press assured during the week, the referee had made a mistake drafting the report and writing the goal scorers because he wrote that the first goal scorer for Castellón scored first and was an alternate who was on the bench (Pol Bueso), and that the FC Cartagena's second goal was an own goal scored by César Martín fifteen minutes later than it really was. For the Liga Adelante's official goals account, the goals were scored by the players that here appear.

Spanish football clubs 2009–10 season
2009-10